These are some of the notable events relating to politics in 2015.

Events

January
 January 1 – The Eurasian Economic Union comes into effect, creating a political and economic union between Russia, Belarus, Armenia, Kazakhstan and Kyrgyzstan.
 January 22 – After Houthi forces seize the presidential palace, Yemeni President Abd Rabbuh Mansur Hadi resigns after months of unrest.

February
 February 12 
 Leaders from Russia, Ukraine, Germany and France reach an agreement on the conflict in eastern Ukraine that includes a ceasefire and withdrawal of heavy weapons. However, several days later, the Ukrainian government and pro-Russian rebels claim that, within its first day, the ceasefire was broken 139 times, as both sides failed to withdraw their heavy weapons and fighting had continued.
 The United Nations Security Council adopts Resolution 2199 to combat terrorism.

March
 March 12 – The Islamic State of Iraq and the Levant becomes allies with fellow jihadist group Boko Haram, effectively annexing the group.
 March 25 – A Saudi Arabia-led coalition of Arab countries starts a military intervention in Yemen in order to uphold the Yemeni government in its fight against the Houthis' southern offensive.

May
 May 20 – The two constituent republics of Novorossiya, the Donetsk People's Republic and the Luhansk People's Republic, announce the suspension of the Novorossiya project, returning to separate (though internationally unrecognised) states.
 May 23 – Ireland votes to legalize same-sex marriage, becoming the first country to legalize same-sex marriage by popular vote.

June
 June 6 – The governments of India and Bangladesh officially ratify their 1974 agreement to exchange enclaves along their border.
 June 25–26 – ISIL claim responsibility for three attacks around the world during Ramadan:
Kobanî massacre: ISIL fighters detonate three car bombs, enter Kobanî, Syria, and open fire at civilians, killing more than 220.
 Sousse attacks: 22-year-old Seifeddine Rezgui opens fire at a tourist resort at Port El Kantaoui, Tunisia, killing 38 people.
 Kuwait mosque bombing: A suicide bomber attacks the Shia Mosque Imam Ja'far as-Sadiq at Kuwait City, Kuwait, killing 27 people and injuring 227 others.

July
July 20 – Cuba and the United States reestablish full diplomatic relations, ending a 54-year stretch of hostility between the nations.
July 24 – Turkey begins a series of airstrikes against PKK and ISIL targets after the 2015 Suruç bombing.

September
 September 30 – Russia begins air strikes against ISIL and anti-government forces in Syria–in support of the Syrian government.

November
 November 7 – Chinese and Taiwanese presidents, Xi Jinping and Ma Ying-jeou, formally meet for the first time.
 November 13 – Multiple terrorist attacks claimed by Islamic State of Iraq and the Levant (ISIL) in Paris, France, result in 130 fatalities.

December
 December 15 – The Islamic Military Alliance is formed in order to fight terrorism.

References 

 
Politics by year
21st century in politics
2010s in politics
Political timelines of the 2010s by year